The QF 14-pounder Mk I  & II was a 3-inch high-velocity naval gun used to equip battleships for defence against torpedo boats.  It was produced for export by Elswick Ordnance Company (Mk I) and Vickers, Sons and Maxim (Mk II). In Royal Navy service they were modified to use the standard 12-pounder shell, while the Italian Regia Marina used the original 14-pounder shells.

Service 
 The gun equipped the two  pre-dreadnought battleships built in Britain for Chile and purchased by the UK in 1903 before completion.
 The gun also equipped the three Conte di Cavour-class dreadnought battleships of the Regia Marina.
 The gun also equipped the two Andrea Doria-class dreadnought battleships of the Regia Marina.
 The gun also equipped the two Pisa-class armored cruisers of the Regia Marina.

British ammunition 
In British service the guns fired the same 3-inch, 12.5 lb shell as QF 12-pounder guns.

See also 
 List of naval guns

References

External links 
 http://www.navweaps.com/Weapons/WNIT_3-50_m1909.php

 

Naval guns of Italy
Naval guns of the United Kingdom
76 mm artillery
World War I naval weapons of the United Kingdom